The Golden Bird is a 2011 Indian science fiction film directed by Amit Dutta. It was screened at the 68th Venice International Film Festival.

Cast
 Nitin Goel
 Gagan Singh Sethi

References

External links
 

2011 films
2011 science fiction films
2010s Hindi-language films
Indian science fiction films